Forest 44 Conservation Area consists of  in western St. Louis County, Missouri. It is located near the town of Valley Park, Missouri and is bordered to the north by Interstate 44. It is part of the Henry Shaw Ozark Corridor.

Forest 44 was once part of a cattle ranch that covered . The land was purchased in 1990 by the Missouri Department of Conservation from the heirs of the Reinken Estates. An additional  were acquired by partial donation and is known as the Dorothy E. Aselman Memorial Addition.

The area is open to hunting and fishing with permits during the appropriate seasons. There is also a staffed shooting range.

References

Conservation Areas of Missouri
Protected areas established in 1990
Protected areas of St. Louis County, Missouri
1990 establishments in Missouri